Calvin Henderson Wiley (February 3, 1819 – January 11, 1887) was a North Carolina educator.  He was the first superintendent of public schools in the state, as well as a novelist.

Early life
Calvin H. Wiley was born on February 3, 1819, in Guilford County, North Carolina. He graduated from the University of North Carolina in 1840 and was admitted to the bar in 1841.

He married Mittie Towles on February 25, 1862, and they had five children.

Career

After serving two years in the North Carolina legislature he became superintendent of common schools on January 1, 1853, and served in that office until the end of the Civil War in 1865, when along with all other state officials he was removed from office. During his term as superintendent he founded and edited the North Carolina Common School Journal in 1856, which lasted only one year but was subsequently put on a firmer footing as the North Carolina Journal of Education.  He was ordained as a minister in the Presbyterian Church in 1866.

Wiley wrote two historical romances set in North Carolina during the American revolution, Alamance (1847) and Roanoke (1849). Roanoke was reissued under a number of titles, including Life in the South (1852), Utopia (1851), and Adventures of Old Dan Tucker (1852). The stories incorporate North Carolina traditions, legends, history, and settings. Under the title, Life at the South, Roanoke was given the subtitle A Companion to Uncle Tom's Cabin, in an effort to capture some of the popularity of Harriet Beecher Stowe's famous text.

Death
Wiley died at his home in Winston, North Carolina, in 1887.

References

1819 births
1887 deaths
Educators from North Carolina
19th-century American novelists
Novelists from North Carolina
North Carolina Superintendents of Public Instruction
People from Guilford County, North Carolina
University of North Carolina alumni
American Presbyterian ministers
Members of the North Carolina General Assembly
19th-century American politicians
People from Salem, North Carolina
North Carolina Whigs
19th-century American educators
19th-century American clergy